Centaurea nigrescens, the Tyrol knapweed, short-fringed knapweed or Tyrol thistle, is a perennial plant in the genus Centaurea that grows natively in Central and South-eastern Europe (from Southern Germany and Northern Italy to Romania and Bulgaria). It has also been introduced and is now a noxious weed in the Northern United States, Canada, and Southern Australia. It has purple flowers and it flowers in the summer (June to September).

References 

nigrescens